Alberto Areces (born 23 November 1970) is a Spanish sports shooter. He competed in the men's 50 metre pistol event at the 1992 Summer Olympics.

References

External links

1970 births
Living people
Spanish male sport shooters
Olympic shooters of Spain
Shooters at the 1992 Summer Olympics
20th-century Spanish people